The AEG C.VIII was a prototype two-seat reconnaissance aircraft of World War I. 
Two examples were built, based on the successful C.IV design, one of biplane configuration, the other a triplane (the latter sometimes referred to as the C.VIII.Dr). Neither version offered enough of an improvement on the C.IV to make mass production worthwhile.

Variants 
 C.VIII - Biplane prototype two-seater fighter/reconnaissance aircraft.
 C.VIII Dr - Triplane version of C.VIII, no improvement in climb and speed reduced to 165 km/h (103.12 mph)

Specifications (AEG C.VIII)

See also

References

Gray, Peter and Thetford, Owen. German Aircraft of the First World War. London:Putnam, 1970 2nd. Ed.

C.VIII
Single-engined tractor aircraft
Biplanes
1910s German military reconnaissance aircraft
Aircraft first flown in 1917